The 2019 Campeonato Goiano  (officially the Campeonato Goiano de Profissionais da 1ª Divisão – Edição 2019) is the 77th edition of Goiás's top professional football league. The competition began on 19 January 2019 and will end on 21 de abril 2019.

Participating teams

Format
In the first stage, the 12 teams were drawn into two groups of six teams each.

Final stage

Quarter-finals

|}

Semi-finals

|}

Final

|}

References

Campeonato Goiano seasons